Kentrochrysalis is a genus of moths in the family Sphingidae. The genus was erected by Otto Staudinger in 1877.

Species
Kentrochrysalis consimilis (Rothschild & Jordan 1903)
Kentrochrysalis heberti Haxaire & Melichar, 2010
Kentrochrysalis sieversi Alpheraky 1897
Kentrochrysalis streckeri (Staudinger 1880)

References

Sphingulini
Moth genera
Taxa named by Otto Staudinger